Operation Pacer may refer to one of two different operations involving Agent Orange

Operation Pacer HO, 1977 operation that incinerated the Agent Orange stored at Johnston Atoll
Operation Pacer IVY, 1972 operation that removed Agent Orange from South Vietnam and stored it on Johnston Atoll